The China men's national floorball team is the national floorball team of China and is organized by the China Floorball Federation.

They made their international debut at the 2017 Asia-Oceania Floorball Cup. China lost all their group stage matches but secured their first international victory in the classification semifinals by defeating the Philippines 3-2 in over time but lost to India in the playoff for 5th place. They finished 6th out of eight teams.

Records

Asia-Oceania Floorball Cup

References

China
Floorball